Rhodocyclus purpureus is a species of bacteria. Its cells are half-ring-shaped and ring-shaped before cell division; the half-rings being 0.6 to 0.7 μm wide and 2.5 to 3.0 μm long. Open or compact coils of variable length are also formed. It is facultatively aerobic and its type strain is “Ames” 6770 (= DSM 168).

References

Further reading

Masters, Richard Alan, and M. I. C. H. A. E. L. Madigan. "Nitrogen metabolism in the phototrophic bacteria Rhodocyclus purpureus and Rhodospirillum tenue."Journal of Bacteriology 155.1 (1983): 222–227.

External links

Type strain of Rhodocyclus purpureus at BacDive -  the Bacterial Diversity Metadatabase

Rhodocyclaceae
Bacteria described in 1978